Brett Hicks-Maitland (born 11 March 1978, in Adelaide) is an Australian actor. He is best known for his role in the Australian television series Home and Away.

Training
Hicks-Maitland studied acting at the Australia's National Institute of Dramatic Art (NIDA) in Sydney. He graduated in 2000 with a Bachelor of Dramatic Arts. He's since continued his studies of acting with Australian Acting Coach Annie Swann and Camera technique teacher Sandra Lee Patterson. Since moving to America he has studied with Howard Fine and Larry Moss.

Career
Hicks-Maitland has been involved in a number of TV shows, including top Australian soap "Home and Away" as a Series Regular playing Dylan Russell from 2002–2004. He has made appearances on the mini-series "Small Claims – the reunion", and ABC's "Changi". He played guest roles on "All Saints", "McLeod's Daughters", "Packed to the Rafters" and "Life Support" (series #3).

In the film "the Longer Day of Happiness" he starred as Garret Jones. In the Australian Film "Dirty Deeds" starring Sam Neill, Sam Worthington and John Goodman, Brett co-starred as Officer Young.

Hicks-Maitland has been involved in many Theater productions, most recently with "Noises Off" at the State Theater of South Austral, "Loot" at the Cat and Fiddle (Sydney, Australia) and "The Eumenedies" at NIDA.
Hicks-Maitland has also been involved in a number of short films, his most recent being an animated Short, "Ward 13" in which he played the lead voice.

Film and Television
 Changi (2001) (1 episode -Gordon's Will) – Bede
 McLeod's Daughters (2001) (1 episode – Who's a Big Girl Now?) – Hopeful
 Home and Away (2002–2004) – Dylan Russell
 Dirty Deeds (2002) – Constable
 Ward 13 (2003) – (Voice)
 Life Support (2004) (1 episode – Mirror Tie) – Frank Jones
 Small Claims: The Reunion (2006) – Shane
 All Saints (2002/2008) – Marcus Drayton/Leon Warner
 Packed to the Rafters (2008) (1 episode – Taking the Lead) – Patrick Moreton
 The Longer Day of Happiness (2012) – Garret Jones

Interests
Hicks-Maitland is an avid golfer. Was an In-Line skater of professional standard and played ice-hockey in his home town of Adelaide, Australia. 
He continues to work and study acting in Los Angeles.

References

External links
 

1978 births
Living people
Australian male television actors
Male actors from Adelaide